Bendougou is a town in the Sanaba Department of Banwa Province in western Burkina Faso. In 2005 it had a population of 2,864.

References

Populated places in the Boucle du Mouhoun Region
Banwa Province